Xylinophylla is a genus of moths in the family Geometridae first described by Warren in 1898.

Species
Some species of this genus are:
Xylinophylla flavifrons (Warren, 1902) (Solomons)
Xylinophylla hypocausta (Warren, 1899) (Malaysia to Borneo, Philippines)
Xylinophylla maculata (Warren, 1897) (New Guinea)
Xylinophylla ochrea Warren, 1898 (Key Islands)

References

Warren (1898). Novitates Zoologicae. 5: 430

Ennominae
Geometridae genera